The Church of San Pedro de Atacama (Iglesia San Pedro de Atacama) is a Catholic church in San Pedro de Atacama, Chile. Constructed during the Spanish colonial period, it is reportedly the second oldest church in Chile. Indigenous adobe material was used in the church's construction, whose appearance is characterized as simple and elegant. The church was built in the seventeenth century, underwent modifications in the eighteenth century, and additions were made in the nineteenth century. The church was declared a historical monument in 1951.

Geography

History
The town's original church was built more than 100 years earlier than the current church. The present church was built in the 17th century during the Spanish colonial rule. The patron saint is Peter. It has undergone many renovations; its present walls are dated to 1744. A tower was a 1964 addition, while other construction occurred in 1978. Restoration work on the  structure occurred in 2009 under the auspices of the Department of Architecture, Antofagasta Region.

Features
The church is constructed of adobe material; there are three doors, an arched stone lintel, and beamed ceiling. Both the interior and exterior are painted white, while the altar is of bright coloring. The walls, roof, and the entrance door are built with algarrobo wood and cardón (cactus wood), and bound together by llama leather, in the technique traditional to the altiplano. The roof is made of large rafters of algarrobo wood that are overlaid with slices of cactus logs. Algorrobo trees are seen along with the pepper trees next to the church. The altarpieces inside the church are carved and painted, and the statues here of St. Mary and St. Joseph contain a fluorescent lighting feature.

References

Roman Catholic churches in Chile